James Worthington (born 21 May 1999) is an English professional rugby league footballer who plays as a  or  for Whitehaven in RFL League 1.

He has played for the Wigan Warriors in the Super League and spent time on loan from Wigan at the Swinton Lions, Toulouse Olympique and the Rochdale Hornets in the Championship, and the London Skolars and Workington Town in Betfred League 1.

Background
Worthington was born in Wigan, Greater Manchester, England.

Career
In 2017 he made his Wigan Super League début against Wakefield Trinity. Whilst scoring two tries and receiving man of the match. He spent one season at Oldham RLFC (Heritage № 1418) after leaving Wigan, and prior to joining Whitehaven RLFC.

Whitehaven
On 10 Feb 2021 it was reported that he had signed for Whitehaven in RFL League 1.

References

External links
Wigan Warriors profile
SL profile

1999 births
Living people
English rugby league players
London Skolars players
Oldham R.L.F.C. players
Rochdale Hornets players
Rugby league centres
Rugby league fullbacks
Rugby league players from Wigan
Swinton Lions players
Toulouse Olympique players
Wigan Warriors players
Whitehaven R.L.F.C. players
Workington Town players